A dot-matrix display is a low-cost electronic digital display device that displays information on machines such as clocks, watches, calculators, and many other devices requiring a simple alphanumeric (and/or graphic) display device of limited resolution.

The display consists of a dot matrix of lights or mechanical indicators arranged in a rectangular configuration (other shapes are also possible, although not common) such that by switching on or off selected lights, text or graphics can be displayed. These displays are normally created with LCD, OLED, or LED lights and can be found in some Thin Film Transistors. The Thin Film Transistors had an active display which allows the dot matrix to display different pixels with different colors at the same time.  A dot matrix controller converts instructions from a processor into signals that turn on or off indicator elements in the matrix so that the required display is produced.

History 
The dot-matrix display is also known by the obsolete term "punktmatrix display" (German for point-matrix) due to the dot matrix being created in Germany by Rudolf Hell in 1925.

On September 1977, the US Army wrote up a form to the Westinghouse Research and Development Center requesting a more effective energy source that soldiers could use in their technology in the field. Japan and America were using the LCD matrices to develop Casio TVs from 1984 to 2000 creating and experimenting with different display setups. In the 1980s, dot-matrix displays were introduced into several technologies including computers, the Game Boy, and television screens that were used. The dot matrix displays became a popular public technology in 1991 America when the company Data East created Checkpoint (pinball) machines that interested the public. Dot-matrix displays were added into new pieces of technology as a background part of LCD or OLED displays as the technology improved.

Pixel resolutions

Common sizes of dot matrix displays:
128×16 (Two-lined)
128×32 (Four-lined)
128×64 (Eight-lined)

Other sizes include:
92×31 (Four or three-lined)

Character resolutions
A common size for a character is 5×7 pixels, either separated with blank lines with no dots (in most text-only displays), or with lines of blank pixels (making the real size 6×8). This is seen on most graphic calculators, such as Casio calculators or TI-82 and superior.
A smaller size is 3×5 (or 4×6 when separated with blank pixels). This is seen on the TI-80 calculator as a "pure", fixed-size 3×5 font, or on most 7×5 calculators as a proportional (1×5 to 5×5) font. The disadvantage of the 7×5 matrix and smaller is that lower case characters with descenders are not practical. A matrix of 11×9 is often used to give a far superior resolution.
Dot matrix displays of sufficient resolution can be programmed to emulate the customary seven-segment numeral patterns.
A larger size is 5×9 pixels, which is used on many "natural display" calculators.

See also
 Display examples
 Flip-disc display
 Fourteen-segment display
 Hitachi HD44780 LCD controller
 LED panel
 Sixteen-segment display
The military request form source number 2.
Detailed manual from SHARP Corporation.

References

Digital imaging